Sigurd Jonsson (1390s –  December 1452) was a Norwegian nobleman, knight and the supreme leader of Norway during two interregnums in the mid-15th century.

Background
Sigurd Jonsson was born at some point between 1390 and 1400. He was the son of the Swedish nobleman Jon Marteinsson (1340–ca. 1400) and Agnes Sigurdsdotter. Agnes was the great-granddaughter of  King Haakon V of Norway, through his illegitimate daughter, Agnes Haakonsdatter (1290–1319) and Havtore Jonsson (1275–1320). Sigurd Jonsson was the grandson and the heir of Sigurd Havtoreson (1315-1392), one of the two sons of Agnes Hakonardottir.

At the time of Sigurd's birth, Jon Marteinsson was a resident in Norway and a member of the Norwegian Council of the Realm (riksrådet). Sigurd grew up at the family's estate in Sudreim (modern Sørum), east of Oslo. He had two sisters, Catherine and Ingeborg, and a brother, Magnus, but his brother did not survive to reach maturity. Sigurd therefore inherited his father's estates, and also great landholdings from his mother's relatives.

As a direct descendant of the old Norwegian royal family, Sigurd was mentioned as a possible candidate for the Norwegian throne. Sigurd was married to Philippa, daughter of Count Hans of Eberstein who was in the service of King Erik of Pomerania and was apparently a relative of the king.

Career
Sigurd is first mentioned as a member of the Norwegian Council of the Realm (Rigsrådet) in 1434.  In 1436, a peasant rebellion led by Amund Sigurdsson Bolt rebelled against King Erik and his officials, besieging Oslo and Akershus Castle. Amund Sigurdsson belonged the noble Bolt family from Våler in Østfold. The Norwegian nobility remained loyal to King Erik. Sigurd Jonsson helped to enter into a ceasefire with Amund Sigurdsson. In September 1439, King Erik gave Sigurd Jonsson the title of drottsete, under which he was to rule Norway in King Erik's name. Sigurd was at the king's court in Visborg in Gotland when he was appointed and he was at the same time made a knight by King Eric.

In 1440, the Norwegian Council of the Realm was compelled to follow the example of Sweden and Denmark, and depose King Eric. Sigurd thus became the ruler of the country, as drottsete, during the interregnum while a new king was sought. Norway followed Denmark and Sweden in electing Christopher of Bavaria as the new king, thus maintaining the union between the three countries. After Christopher's coronation in Oslo on 2 July 1442, Sigurd relinquished the title of drottsete. During Christopher's reign, Sigurd remained a prominent member of the Norwegian Council. He was the commander of Akershus Fortress from 1440 to 1445, and one of the leading proponents of the anti-Hanseatic policies in Norway during King Christopher's reign. He was at this time probably the largest land-owner in Norway.

In January 1448, King Christopher died suddenly. Sigurd again became the ruler of the country. In a letter from June the same year, he is referred to as guardian of the realm (rikens forstandare). After King Christopher's death, Sweden and Denmark elected different kings, and there was talk of Norway also electing its own king. Sigurd Jonsson, as a direct descendant of King Haakon V, was the most likely candidate. However, he himself declined this possibility, and instead put his weight behind King Christian I of Denmark as the new king of Norway. Christian won the power struggle against King Charles VIII of Sweden in July 1449 and was crowned as king of Norway in 1450. Sigurd was at the coronation of Christian in Trondheim and the signing of the Norwegian-Danish union treaty in Bergen in August 1450. After the election of King Christian, Sigurd's title was changed to "National Captain in the King's Absence" (rikets høvedsmann i kongens fravær), a title he probably retained for life. He is mentioned for the last time alive in a letter from December 1452, and presumably died shortly after this.

When Sigurd Jonsson died, his only son, Hans Sigurdsson inherited large estates, both in Norway and Shetland. Hans, who had been betrothed to Ingeborg Ågesdatter, died unmarried in 1466. Sigurd's  great-nephew, Alv Knutsson, inherited  the Sørum estate in Romerike and Giske estate in Sunnmøre. Alv Knutsson was the grandson of Catherine Jonsdotter, the sister of Sigurd Jonsson. Alv's mother was Agnes Alvsdatter who was the daughter of Catherine and Alv Haraldsson.

See also
Sudreim claim

References

Sources
Hamre, Lars Norsk historie frå omlag år 1400 (Oslo, 1968)

1390s births
1452 deaths
15th-century Norwegian monarchs
Regents of Norway
Norwegian people of Swedish descent
People from Våler, Østfold